The women's canoe slalom C-1 competition at the 2019 Pan American Games in Lima took place between 3 and 4 August at the Cañete River in Lunahuaná.

The gold medal was won by Ana Sátila of the Brazil.

Schedule 
All times are Local Time (UTC−5).

Results

References 

Women's slalom C-1